The Men's 15 kilometre biathlon mass start competition at the 2006 Winter Olympics in Turin, Italy was held on 25 February, at Cesana San Sicario. Competitors raced over five loops of a 3.0 kilometre skiing course, shooting twenty times, ten prone and ten standing. Each miss required a competitor to ski a 150-metre penalty loop.

Only thirty athletes competed in the mass start, which was making its Olympic debut. Ole Einar Bjørndalen was defending World Champion, but was tenth in the overall World Cup, which was led by France's Raphaël Poirée. Tomasz Sikora's silver medal finish was the first biathlon medal ever for Poland, men's or women's.

Results 
The race was held at 10:00.

References

Men's biathlon at the 2006 Winter Olympics